John Gilbert Arbour (born September 28, 1945) is a Canadian former professional ice hockey player who played in both the National Hockey League and the World Hockey Association. A stocky, physical defenceman, Arbour also developed an offensive dimension to his game later in his career.

Playing career

NHL years
Arbour came up through the Boston Bruins organization, but only played 6 games in Boston before being sold to the Pittsburgh Penguins in 1968. He appeared in 17 games for the Penguins in 1968–69, but found himself in the WHL for 1969–70 with the Vancouver Canucks. After a fine season in Vancouver, Arbour was one of 6 players to remain a Vancouver Canuck when the team became an NHL franchise the following year. However, he only lasted 13 games before being dealt to the St. Louis Blues. 1970–71 would be his only full NHL campaign, as he appeared in 66 games between Vancouver and St. Louis, recording his only career NHL goal and 7 points. The following year, he appeared in 17 more games for the Blues, but again found himself mainly in the WHL.

WHA years
Arbour jumped to the upstart World Hockey Association in 1972, joining the Minnesota Fighting Saints. In Minnesota, he experienced the most successful portion of his pro career. He immediately established himself as one of the club's top defenceman, finishing his first season with 6 goals and 33 points, along with 186 penalty minutes. In 1973–74, his numbers continued to improve, as he led the Saints' defenceman in scoring with 6 goals and 49 points. In 1974–75, he posted career highs of 12 goals and 55 points, again the highest-scoring defenceman on his team.

Early in the 1975–76 season, he was dealt to the Denver Spurs, who ultimately folded mid-season. For 1976–77, he found himself back with the Fighting Saints, but finished out the season with the Calgary Cowboys after Minnesota, too, folded mid-year. He then chose to retire from pro hockey.

Arbour appeared in 106 NHL games, recording 1 goal and 10 points, along with 149 PIM. He also recorded 30 goals and 194 points in 335 WHA games, along with 568 PIM.

Career statistics

Regular season and playoffs

External links

1945 births
Living people
Baltimore Clippers players
Boston Bruins players
Calgary Cowboys players
Canadian ice hockey defencemen
Denver Spurs (WHA) players
Denver Spurs (WHL) players
Sportspeople from Niagara Falls, Ontario
Minnesota Fighting Saints players
Niagara Falls Flyers (1960–1972) players
Oklahoma City Blazers (1965–1977) players
Ottawa Civics players
Pittsburgh Penguins players
St. Louis Blues players
Vancouver Canucks (WHL) players
Vancouver Canucks players
Ice hockey people from Ontario
Canadian expatriate ice hockey players in the United States